"Wire to Wire" is a song by English indie rock band Razorlight, written by singer Johnny Borrell, from their third album Slipway Fires. It was officially released as the album's first single on 27 October 2008. It was released for downloads digitally, however, on 26 September. The song is a piano-led ballad, described as "slow-burning".

The song marked the band's fourth UK top-five single and their fifth to chart in the UK top 10. It peaked at  5 on the UK Singles Chart, and No. 3 in Germany and Austria. The song has also peaked No. 8 in Switzerland, No. 13 in Flanders, No. 23 in Ireland, and No. 71 in the Netherlands. It spent only seven weeks in the UK top 100, less than each of the first three singles from the preceding album Razorlight. The accompanying music video was shot by Oscar nominated feature film director Stephen Frears.

The track was used as part of Burberry's introductory advertisement in its Fall/Winter 2009 collection.

Track listings
European 7-inch single
A. "Wire to Wire" – 2:58
B. "The Other Girl" – 1:54

European CD single
 "Wire to Wire" – 3:01
 "Killing Casanova" – 1:55

Charts

Weekly charts

Year-end charts

Decade-end charts

Certifications

References

2000s ballads
2008 singles
2008 songs
Razorlight songs
Songs written by Johnny Borrell
Vertigo Records singles